The Toko-Stanovik (Tokinsky Stanovik) is a range of mountains in the Russian Far East. Administratively it belongs partly to Amur Oblast, the Sakha Republic (Yakutia) and Khabarovsk Krai of the Russian Federation. 

The nearest airport is Neryungri Airport.

Geography
The Toko-Stanovik is a subrange of the Stanovoy Range located in the eastern part. There are two small subranges: the Dzhugdyr Range, with the sources of the Argi, stretches southeastwards from its central part, and the Atagsky Range, stretches southeastwards to the east, in the area of the sources of the Maya. 

River Zeya has its sources in the southern slopes of the range. On the northern side originate several rivers of the Uchur basin, such as the Algama, Mulam and Tyrkan, as well as the sources of Bolshoye Toko. This lake, which gives its name to the range, is located at the feet of the northern slopes of the Toko-Stanovik in the Aldan Highlands.

Flora 
The slopes of the range are covered by taiga, mainly consisting of larch, with dwarf cedar above .

See also
List of mountains and hills of Russia
List of ultras of Northeast Asia
Neryungrinsky District
Zeysky District

References

External links
Озеро Большое Токо и Хребет Токинский
South Siberian Mountains
Mountain ranges of Amur Oblast
Mountain ranges of Khabarovsk Krai
Mountain ranges of the Sakha Republic
Mountain ranges of Russia
nl:Tokinski Stanovik